In January 2021, a number of companies halted their political contributions in the United States, primarily in response to some Republican legislators' objections to certification of the 2021 United States Electoral College vote count and the ensuing mob that attacked the U.S. Capitol. All of these companies announced suspension of donations to legislators and/or executive branch members who were challenging the vote certification, unless otherwise stated.

#
 3M – Halted all political donations for further review

A
 ADM – Halted all political donations for further review
 Aflac – Resumed political donations in June 2021
 Airbnb
 Amazon
 American Airlines – Resumed political donations in June 2021
 American Express
 American Investment Council – Halted all political donations for further review
 AT&T

B
 BAE Systems – Resumed political donations in March 2021
 Bank of America – Halted all political donations for further review
 Best Buy
 BlackRock – Halted all political donations for further review
 Blue Cross Blue Shield Association
 Boeing – Resumed political donations in May 2021
 Booz Allen Hamilton – Halted all political donations for further review
 Boston Scientific – Halted all political donations for further review
 BP – Halted all political donations for further review

C
 Cargill – Halted all political donations for further review
 Cboe Global Markets – Halted all political donations for further review
 Charles Schwab – Permanently halted all political donations, shut down PAC
 Cheniere Energy – Halted all political donations for further review
 Cigna – Pledged to "discontinue support of elected officials who encouraged or supported violence, or hindered the peaceful transition of power" in public statement issued January 2021; clarified that voting against certification of the 2020 presidential election did not rise to that standard and resumed donations as of April 2021
 Cisco Systems
 Citigroup – Halted all political donations for further review
 CME Group – Halted all political donations for further review
 The Coca-Cola Company
 Comcast – Halted all political donations for further review
 Commerce Bancshares
 ConocoPhillips – Halted all political donations for further review

D
 Deloitte 
 Dow Chemical 
 Disney
 Duke Energy – Paused all political contributions for 30 days

E
 Edison International – Halted all political donations for further review
 Edward Jones Investments – Halted all political donations for further review
 Exelon

F
 Facebook, Inc. – Halted all political donations for further review
 FedEx – Halted all political donations for further review
 FirstEnergy – Halted all political donations for further review
 Ford Motor Company – Halted all political donations for further review; resumed political donations in June 2021 after getting input from members of its employee-funded PAC
 Freeport-McMoRan – Halted all political donations for further review

G
 General Electric
 General Motors – Announced suspension to political donations in January 2021, along with statement that "[c]haracter and public integrity aligning with GM's core values" would factor into future donations; resumed political donations in June 2021
 Gilead Sciences – Halted all political donations for further review
 Goldman Sachs – Halted all political donations for further review
 Google – Halted all political donations for further review

H
 Hallmark Cards – Additionally asked two Senators to return contributions
 Hilton Worldwide – Suspended political donations in March 2020; announced in January 2021 that it will keep donations "suspended indefinitely"
 Honeywell
 Huntington Ingalls Industries – Resumed political donations in June 2021

I
 Intel – Halted all political donations for further review
 Intercontinental Exchange – Halted all political donations for further review
 Investment Company Institute – Halted all political donations for further review

J
 JBS USA – Halted all political donations for further review
 JetBlue – Resumed political donations in April 2021
 JPMorgan Chase – Halted all political donations for further review

K
 Kraft Heinz
 Kroger – Halted all political donations for further review

L
 Leidos – Resumed political donations in June 2021
 Loan Syndications and Trading Association – Halted all political donations for further review
 Lockheed Martin – Resumed political donations in June 2021

M
 Major League Baseball – Halted all political donations for further review
 Managed Funds Association – Halted all political donations for further review
 Marathon Petroleum – Halted all political donations for further review
 Marriott International
 MassMutual
 Mastercard
 McDonald's – Halted all political donations for further review
 Microsoft – Halted all political donations for further review
 Morgan Stanley

N
 Nasdaq, Inc. – Halted all political donations for further review
 National Association of Realtors – Resumed political donations in April 2021
 Nike, Inc.
 Northrop Grumman – Resumed political donations in June 2021

P
 PepsiCo – Halted all political donations for further review
 PricewaterhouseCoopers

R
 Raytheon Technologies – Halted all political donations for further review
 Rocket Holdings (Quicken Loans) – Announced a $750,000 donation to Joe Biden's inauguration committee, then halted all political donations for further review

S
 Salesforce – Halted all political donations for further review
 Smithfield Foods – Halted all political donations for further review
 Southern Company – Pledged to "discontinue support for any official or organization" who lacked "values we follow as a business — honesty, respect, fairness, integrity and the value of diversity"; resumed donating to politicians who contested the 2020 presidential election as of June 2021
 Squire Patton Boggs – Halted all political donations for further review
 State Street Corporation

T
 Target Corporation – Halted all political donations for further review
 Toyota – Resumed political donations in April 2021
 Tyson Foods – Resumed political donations in June 2021

U
 United Parcel Service – Resumed political donations in June 2021

V
 Valero Energy – Halted all political donations for further review
 Verizon
 Visa Inc. – Halted all political donations for further review

W
 Walmart
 Wells Fargo – Halted all political donations for further review

References

Halt
List
Halt
Halt
Halt
Halt
Halt
Halt
Halt
Halt
Halt